{{Infobox election
| election_name   = 2018 Perak state election
| country         = Perak
| type            = legislative
| ongoing         = no
| previous_election = 2013 Perak state election
| previous_year   = 2013
| previous_mps    = List of Malaysian State Assembly Representatives (2013–2018)#Perak
| next_election   = 2022 Perak state election
| next_year       = 2022
| next_mps        = 
| elected_mps     = List of Malaysian State Assembly Representatives (2018-)#Perak
| seats_for_election = All 59 seats in the Perak State Legislative Assembly 
| majority_seats  = 30
| election_date   = 9 May 2018

| image1           = Dato' Seri Ahmad Faizal Dato' Haji Azumu.jpg
| image1_size      = 150px
| leader1          = Ahmad Faizal Azumu
| leader_since1    = 30 August 2017
| party1           = Pakatan Harapan (PPBM)
| colour1          = E21118
| leaders_seat1    = Chenderiang 
| last_election1   = 23 seats, 44.33%   (Pakatan Rakyat)
| seats_needed1    =  6
| seats_before1    = 24
| seat_change1     = 5
| seats1           = 29
| popular_vote1    = 595,219
| percentage1      = 50.1%
| swing1           = 5.8%

| image2           = 
| image2_size      = 150px
| leader2          = Dr. Zambry Abd. Kadir
| leader_since2    = 4 March 2004
| party2           = Barisan Nasional (UMNO)
| color2           = 000080
| leaders_seat2    = Pangkor
| last_election2   = 31 seats, 44.95%
| seats_needed2    = | seats_before2    = 31
| seat_change2     = 4
| seats2           = 27
| popular_vote2    = 395,708
| percentage2      = 33.3%
| swing2           = 11.7%

| image3           =  GS
| image3_size      = 150px
| leader3          = Razman Zakaria
| leader_since3    = 20 April 2018
| party3           = Gagasan Sejahtera (PAS)
| colour3          = 009000
| leaders_seat3    = Gunong Semanggol 
| last_election3   = 5 seats, 10.35%   (Pakatan Rakyat)
| seats_needed3    =  26
| seats_before3    = 4
| seat_change3     = 1
| seats3           = 3
| popular_vote3    = 194,735
| percentage3      = 16.4%
| swing3           = 6.0%

| title            = Menteri Besar
| before_election  = Zambry Abdul Kadir
| before_party     = BN–UMNO
| after_election   = Ahmad Faizal Azumu
| after_party      = PH–BERSATU
| map_image        = GE14 Perak DUN.svg
| map_size         =
| map_caption      =Pakatan Harapan seats:Opposition seats':

}}
The 14th Perak State election was held on 9 May 2018. The previous state election was held on 5 May 2013. Each of the state assemblymen are elected to a five year term each.

The Perak State Legislative Assembly automatically dissolved on 28 June 2018, the fifth anniversary of the first sitting, and elections were required to be held within sixty days (two months) of the dissolution (on or before 28 August 2018, with the date to be decided by the Election Commission), unless dissolved prior to that date by the Head of State (Sultan of Perak) on the advice of the Head of Government (Menteri Besar of Perak).

Pakatan Harapan (PH) gained a plurality in the election, winning 29 seats but still short of 1 seat for a simple majority win, until 2 MLAs from Barisan Nasional (BN) quit their parties to support PH, enabling it to form the state government. Ahmad Faizal Azumu, from BERSATU, was sworn in as Menteri Besar on 12 May 2018, while the state EXCO members were sworn in on 19 May 2020.

Contenders
Barisan Nasional (BN) contested all 59 seats in Perak State Legislative Assembly. Barisan Nasional (BN) linchpin party United Malays National Organisation (UNMO) contested a major share of Barisan Nasional (BN) seats.

Pakatan Harapan also contested all 59 seats in Perak with Democratic Action Party (DAP) was largest contested 18 seats while National Trust Party (Amanah) contested 13 seats and both People's Justice Party (PKR) and the Malaysian United Indigenous Party (Bersatu) contested 14 seats each. Pakatan Harapan will use PKR logo as its logo for election.

Gagasan Sejahtera contested all 56 seats in Perak. Pan-Malaysian Islamic Party (PAS) competed for 43 seats. The remaining 16 seats were distributed to Parti Cinta Malaysia (PCM).

Parti Sosialis Malaysia (PSM) will contest 5 seats in Buntong, Jelapang, Menglembu, Tronoh and Malim Nawar.

 Political parties 

The contested seats

 Election pendulum 

The 14th General Election witnessed 29 governmental seats (2 from non-governmental seats were later decided to support the creation of new state government) and 30 non-governmental seats (currently 28 seats after 2 of them decided to support new government'') filled the Perak State Legislative Assembly. The government side has 18 safe seat and 1 fairly safe seat. However, none of the non-government side has safe and fairly safe seat.

Results

Seats that changed allegiance

Aftermath
Two MLAs from BN who stated their support for PH, Zainol Fadzi Paharudin and Nolee Ashilin Mohammed Radzi, despite their insistence they are not quitting the party for supporting PH, were automatically sacked by UMNO and BN on 14 May 2018. They both later joined Bersatu.

The Pakatan Harapan state government led by Ahmad Faizal only lasts 22 months, when in the wake of 2020 Malaysian political crisis and exit of Bersatu MLAs from PH resulted in a new state government under a coalition between BN and Perikatan Nasional (Bersatu and PAS) on March 2020, with Ahmad Faizal re-appointed as Menteri Besar. That government, in turn only lasted another 9 months before Ahmad Faizal lost a vote of confidence motion tabled by BN, resulting in his resignation and another new government formed and led by BN's Saarani Mohammad in December 2020.

References

Perak state elections
Perak
Perak